Rio Verde Grande (Portuguese for "big green river") is a river of Minas Gerais state in eastern Brazil, that forms the boundary with Bahia state in its lowest reaches.
It is a tributary of the  São Francisco River.

The Caminho dos Gerais State Park protects the sources of the Verde Pequeno River, a tributary of the Rio Verde Grande, which in turn is a tributary of the São Francisco River.

See also
List of rivers of Minas Gerais
List of rivers of Bahia

References

Sources

Rivers of Bahia